Pymmes Park is located in Edmonton, London and is bordered by the North Circular Road. 
The park is a Metropolitan Open Space, Local Importance of Nature Conservation, and a site of Archaeological Importance.

History
The area known as Pymmes Park dates back to 1327 when William Pymme built Pymmes House there. Prior to 1578 the estate changed hands several times until Thomas Wilson a statesman bought the estate in 1579. In 1582 William Cecil, 1st Baron Burghley, Lord High Treasurer, purchased the estate which remained in the family until 1801. The Ray family owned the estate from 1808 to 1899. The estate was then purchased by the local council to provide public open space following an increase in the local population. The park was opened to the public in 1906.

Gardens
The park contains a Victorian walled garden, bounded on three sides by Grade II listed walls, containing an ornamental pond, herbaceous borders and bedding plants. Access is on request to a member of the Parks staff.

Recent history
In recent years, the park has undergone major changes due mainly to the widening of the North Circular Road in the 1990s. An application to the Heritage Lottery Fund was successful and £2.8 million was granted for the restoration of the Victorian Parkland in a scheme known as the Pymmes Park restoration project.

Pymmes Park lake has suffered from severe pollution for many years. In 2014, the London Borough of Enfield announced plans to create a 
wetland covering  to improve the quality of the water entering the lake.

Recreation
Facilities include a bowls club, tennis courts. multi-use games area, football pitches, children's playground, lake and ornamental pond. The Pymmes Brook Trail follows the approximate course of Pymmes Brook which flows through the park. Since 2011, a weekly  Parkrun is held in the park.

Public transport
Silver Street railway station

Buses

34
102
144
149
192
259
279
349
444

References

External links

 Pymmes Park information
 Photos of Pymmes Park

Parks and open spaces in the London Borough of Enfield
Edmonton, London